Les Panthères de St-Jérome are a junior ice hockey team from Saint-Jérôme, Quebec, Canada.  They are a part of the Quebec Junior Hockey League.

History
The franchise was founded in 1988 as the Saint-Antoine Rapidos.  A season later they were known as the Laval-Laurentides Panthers.  In 1992, the team moved to Saint-Jerome.

The Panthers won the Fred Page Cup in 2001, earning the right to compete at the 2001 Royal Bank Cup, the Canadian Junior "A" National Championship.

The Panthers have been, in recent years, continually in the upper echelon of the QJAAAHL and were awarded hosting duties for the 2007 Fred Page Cup.

Season-by-season record
Note: GP = Games Played, W = Wins, L = Losses, T = Ties, OTL = Overtime Losses, GF = Goals for, GA = Goals against

External links
Panthers Webpage

Ligue de Hockey Junior AAA Quebec teams
Saint-Jérôme